Steven Dane Irwin (born July 1, 1959) is an American lawyer, activist, and politician who currently serves as Chair of the Pennsylvania Advisory Committee of the U.S. Commission on Civil Rights and previously served as the Banking and Securities Commissioner of Pennsylvania.

A member of the Democratic Party, Irwin ran for Congress in 2022, but was defeated in one of the nation's closest races, by State Representative Summer Lee in the primary.

Early life
Irwin spent his early childhood in Queens, New York and moved to St. Petersburg, Florida when he was age 10. His father, a Korean War veteran, worked as a butcher and his mother worked as a secretary to a Rabbi. One of the only Jews in St. Petersburg, he was often bullied and his house was egged because he was Jewish. He attended Harvard University, on a scholarship, and went on to attend Georgetown Law School. At Georgetown Law, Irwin wrote for three of the school's law journals.

Career
Irwin worked as a legislative aid for Senator Arlen Specter from 1982 to 1986. While working for Specter, Irwin took a leading role in helping to establish the Pittsburgh Light Rail and the Martin Luther King Jr. East Busway. Following his work with Specter, Irwin moved to Pittsburgh, to live with his wife, a Pittsburgh-native. His first job in Pittsburgh was clerking for judge Joseph F. Weis Jr., who served on the United States Court of Appeals for the Third Circuit. 

Irwin is an attorney and litigates complex commercial, employment and regulatory matters. He serves as counsel for the Healthcare Council of Western Pennsylvania, Pittsburgh Zoo and PPG Aquarium. 

In 2006, Irwin was nominated to the position of Banking Commissioner of Pennsylvania, by Governor Ed Rendell and he was confirmed by the Pennsylvania Senate. Irwin served in this position, during the Rendell and Corbett administrations before Corbett, a Republican, removed him from the position in 2014. In this position, Irwin oversaw state investment regulations and fought financial fraud. He closely worked with the North American Securities Administrators Association to translate the Dodd-Frank Act to the state level.

Irwin has long been an active member of the Allegheny County Democratic Committee and served as the campaign manager, four times, for the Democratic nominees running for Attorney General of Pennsylvania. Irwin also serves as the host of the Pittsburgh political show, "Political Jungle" that airs on PCTV.

2022 Congressional campaign
Irwin announced his candidacy for Pennsylvania's 12th congressional district in November 2021. Congressman Mike Doyle had previously announced his retirement and went on to endorse Irwin's candidacy in March 2022. Irwin's candidacy was also endorsed by former Pittsburgh Mayor Bill Peduto, Rendell and Democratic Majority for Israel.

The initial votes, which were primarily mail-in ballots, favored Irwin and he held a commanding lead on much of election night. However, his lead shrank when in-person votes were tabulated and he lost to State Representative Summer Lee by less than 750 votes.

Personal life
Irwin is married to his wife, Andi, an artist, and has three children. He is an avid musician and plays the accordion. 

He is a former member of the synagogue, Tree of Life – Or L'Simcha Congregation where there was a mass shooting in 2018. Irwin personally knew about half of the 11 shooting victims.

Irwin currently serves on the Anti-Defamation League's Midwest regional board and previously served as an ADL National Commissioner.

References

1959 births
21st-century American politicians
Candidates in the 2022 United States House of Representatives elections
Georgetown University Law Center alumni
Living people
Pennsylvania Democrats
Harvard University alumni
21st-century American Jews